The Bolashak Programme (the Bolashak International Scholarship) is a scholarship which is awarded to high-performing students from Kazakhstan to study overseas all-expenses paid, provided that they return to Kazakhstan to work for at least five years after graduation.

Since its implementation in 1993, more than 10,000 students have been awarded the scholarship. Most of these students travel to study in the United States, but also elsewhere around the world.

Description
The word "Bolashak" is translated into English as "Future". It was instituted by the first President of Kazakhstan Nursultan Nazarbayev in 1993. Slate columnist Joshua Kucera writes that President Nazarbayev has "billed it as a way to inculcate Kazakhstan's youth with Western, democratic values." Kucera acknowledges in his article, however, that while they are sent overseas to learn new ideas and western values, they are often not given authority to implement positive changes.

Many Bolashak graduates hold main positions in state and private organizations within Kazakhstan.

According to an article in Zhas Alash, 10/25/1996, Kuanysh Satybaldievich Sazanov, a political economist, was recognized as the first Bolashak scholarship recipient.  Mr. Sazanov finished his two year program in 18 months, and in a symbolic gesture, presented the first Bolashak diploma to Kazakhstan’s first president, Nursultan Nazarbayev. 

From 1994 through 2004, 785 students were granted the Bolashak scholarship. By 2017, 12,046 more scholarships had been granted, making a total of 12,831 scholarships by the year 2018.

In 2005, the total number of applicants who applied for the Bolashak program was recorded as 6,698. Compared to 2004, the amount of applicants increased by 45%. Moreover, this amount exceeded the yearly intake of major universities in Kazakhstan.

During the competition process of the year 2005, 537 applicant records were rejected due to nonconformity to the competition rules for awarding the Bolashak International Scholarship. The applicants, approved for conformity to the Rules of Selection, underwent language and psychological testing. Based upon results of the tests, they were recommended for consideration by the Experts Committee. As a result, in the year 2005, 1,796 applicants were awarded the Bolashak scholarship.

In 2006, the receipt of documents for participation at the selection process was conducted from April 26 through May 15, 2006  and from September 15 through October 31, 2006. During the first intake 809 files were received and 1,620 were received during the second intake. After language and psychological testing in the year 2006, 778 students were awarded the scholarship.

On April 20, 2007 by the decision of the Republican Committee for preparation of specialists abroad, the scholarship was granted to 82 applicants, on August 16 – to 185 applicants.

On January 24, 2008 the Bolashak Scholarship was awarded to 223 candidates. On April 28, 2008 the Bolashak Scholarship was awarded to 104 candidates. On August 13, 2008 the Bolashak Scholarship was awarded to 356 candidates.

Overall, as of 2009 5,950 students were awarded by a scholarship. Around 2,000 out of them were employed by the government and national companies. In 2009, 800 students returned to Kazakhstan.

In 2012, young people of Kazakhstan were granted the opportunity to study in 32 countries at 630 leading universities overseas.

Ethnic distribution
According to last period statistics of 2008, 93.6% of candidates recommended for competition were of Kazakh ethnicity, followed by 3% of ethnic Russian, 0.9% ethnic Korean and 0.5% ethnic Tatar, basically due to essential criteria of the scholarship is the knowledge of the Kazakh language. On the other hand, last 1999 census showed the country's ethnic make-up to be 67.4% Kazakh, 25.9% Russian, 3.7% Ukrainian and 2.5% Uzbek, and that the Kazakh language is spoken by 64.4% of population, primarily by the ethnic Kazakhs.

References

External links
Center for International Programs
Bolashak Students' Forum
Bolashak student`s testimonials: Questions&Answers, HowTo
Bolashak students at MIT - Massachusetts Institute of Technology
Bolashak students about Kazakhstan

1993 establishments in Kazakhstan
Awards established in 1993
Scholarships in Kazakhstan